is a Prefectural Natural Park in northeast Miyagi Prefecture, Japan. First designated for protection in 1948, the park is within the municipality of Kesennuma.

See also
 National Parks of Japan
 Rikuchū Kaigan National Park
 Minami Sanriku Kinkasan Quasi-National Park

References

External links
  Maps of Kesennuma Prefectural Natural Park (4, 5 & 10)

Parks and gardens in Miyagi Prefecture
Protected areas established in 1948
1948 establishments in Japan
Kesennuma